The anb is a major bank based in Riyadh, Saudi Arabia and listed on the Saudi Stock Exchange. It is among the top ten largest banks in the Middle East and has received an 'A' rank from Standard and Poor's. It has 156 branches in Saudi Arabia. Its largest shareholder is Arab Bank, holding 40% of the fund.

History
anb established a branch in Jeddah in 1949. One of the founders is Prince Khalid, son of Prince Turki bin Abdulaziz. Early on, both the Governments of Saudi Arabia and Kuwait took on small stakes in anb of about 10 per cent each. Despite this and despite being pan-Arab in its orientation, anb was unable to escape the policy limiting foreign ownership. In 1980, it transferred its six branches to the newly created anb. Arab National had a service agreement with anb that expired in 1988 and was not renewed. anb owns 40 per cent of the bank and some 5000 Saudi shareholders own 60 per cent. In 2002, the Governments of Saudi Arabia and Kuwait own about eight per cent of anb between them. anb has opened a branch in London. Its largest shareholder (40%) is anb and headquartered in Amman, Jordan.

See also

List of banks in Saudi Arabia

References

Companies listed on Tadawul
Islamic banks of Saudi Arabia
Companies based in Riyadh
Banks of Saudi Arabia
1949 establishments in Saudi Arabia
Banks established in 1949